Peterborough East was an electoral riding in Ontario, Canada. It was created in 1867 at the time of confederation and was abolished in 1926. In 1926, Peterborough East and Peterborough West were redistributed into two ridings Peterborough City and Peterborough County. This lasted until 1934 when both ridings were merged into one riding called Peterborough.

Members of Provincial Parliament

References

Former provincial electoral districts of Ontario